The 1953 South Carolina 4th congressional district special election was held on June 2, 1953 to select a Representative for the 4th congressional district to serve out the remainder of the term for the 83rd Congress.  The special election resulted from the death of Representative Joseph R. Bryson on March 10, 1953.  Robert T. Ashmore emerged as the winner in a crowded field of Democrats.

General election campaign
The South Carolina Democratic Party decided to forgo a primary election so the general election held on June 2 featured a crowded field of six Democrats.  The South Carolina Republican Party was nothing more than a patronage institution at the time and it had no chance to win the seat so no Republican filed for the election.  Robert T. Ashmore, a solicitor from Greenville, prevailed over Spartanburg State Senator Charles C. Moore.

Election results

|-
| 
| colspan=5 |Democratic hold
|-

See also
South Carolina's 4th congressional district

References

"Report of the Secretary of State to the General Assembly of South Carolina." Reports and Resolutions of South Carolina to the General Assembly of the State of South Carolina. Volume I. Columbia, SC: 1954, p. 173.

South Carolina 1953 04
South Carolina 1953 04
1953 04
South Carolina 04
United States House of Representatives 04
United States House of Representatives 1953 04